Rikke Møller Pedersen (born 9 January 1989) is a Danish competitive swimmer specialising in breaststroke and from 2013 to 2021 world record holder in the 200 m breaststroke (2:19.11).

Career
In 2009, Møller Pedersen won a gold medal in the 200 m breaststroke at the European Short Course Swimming Championships.

In 2010, she won a Bronze Medal in the 200 m breaststroke at the World Short Course Swimming Championships, while she placed second in the 100 m breaststroke and third in the 200 m breaststroke at the European Aquatics Championships.

At the 2011 European Short Course Swimming Championships, she won two gold medals, in the 4×50 m medley relay and in the 200 m breaststroke respectively, and a Silver Medal in the 100 m breaststroke.

In 2012, Møller Pedersen competed at the Summer Olympics for the first time.
At the 2012 European Short Course Swimming Championships in Chartres she placed first in the 100 m breaststroke and she set the European record with a time of 1:04.12.
In this edition of the European Short Course Championships, she also won the 200 m breaststroke and the 4×50 m medley relay events, while she placed second in the 50 m breaststroke.

At the 2012 World Short Course Swimming Championships in Istanbul, she won the 200 m breaststroke event with a winning time of
2:16.08, the new championship record. In Istanbul, she also placed third in the 100 m breaststroke and first in the 4 × 100 m medley relay.

At the 2013 Danish Open Championships, she broke the European record in the 200 m breaststroke (long course) swimming in 2:20.53.
The previous record belonged to Russian Yuliya Yefimova who had set a time of 2:20.92 at the 2012 London Olympics.

At the 2013 World Aquatics Championships, Møller Pedersen broke Rebecca Soni's 200 m breaststroke world record in the semifinals with 2:19.11, but she finished 2nd in the final behind Russian Yuliya Yefimova with a time of 2:20.08.

At the 2016 Summer Olympics in Rio de Janeiro, she won a bronze medal as a part of the 4 × 100 m medley relay alongside Jeanette Ottesen, Mie Ø. Nielsen and Pernille Blume. Here they also broke the European record with a time of 3:55.01.

In April 2017 Rikke Møller Pedersen competed in the Danish Open national qualifiers for the upcoming World Championships in Budapest. She took part in the 100 m breaststroke event and finished first with a time of 1:07.33, which qualified her for the World Championships.

Rikke Møller Pedersen competed in the 2017 Stockholm Swim Cup. In the 50 m breaststroke event she finished third with a time of 31.45. She won the 200 m breaststroke event by posting a time of 2:25.59.

After a distinguished career spanning over several Olympic Games, she announced her retirement in January 2019 via posts on her Facebook and Instagram profiles.

References

External links
RikkeMoller.com – Official website of Rikke Møller Pedersen
Rikke's swimming results at the-sports.org

1989 births
Living people
Danish female breaststroke swimmers
Swimmers at the 2012 Summer Olympics
Swimmers at the 2016 Summer Olympics
Olympic swimmers of Denmark
Medalists at the FINA World Swimming Championships (25 m)
European Aquatics Championships medalists in swimming
World Aquatics Championships medalists in swimming
World record holders in swimming
Sportspeople from Odense
Olympic bronze medalists for Denmark
Olympic bronze medalists in swimming
Medalists at the 2016 Summer Olympics